Rosebud Creek may refer to:

 Rosebud Creek (South Dakota)
 Rosebud Creek (Montana)
 Rosebud Creek (Yukon)
 Rosebud Creek, Alberta
 East Rosebud Creek

See also 
 Rosebud (disambiguation)